The Legacy of Sacco and Vanzetti is a 1948 book by G. Louis Joughin and Edmund M. Morgan on the cultural impact of the Sacco and Vanzetti case.

References 

 
 
 
 
 
 
 
 
 
 
 

1948 non-fiction books
English-language books
Harcourt (publisher) books
Works about Sacco and Vanzetti